The Pavelló de la Mar Bella is an indoor arena located in Barcelona, Catalonia. Seating 4000, it hosted the badminton events for 1992 Summer Olympics. 

This venue was completed in time for the 1992 Games.

References

Venues of the 1992 Summer Olympics
Olympic badminton venues
Mar Bella
Sports venues completed in 1992
Sports venues in Barcelona
Badminton venues